Slingshot is the sixth album by American bass guitarist Michael Henderson, released in 1981 by Buddah Records.

Track listing
"Slingshot"  4:20 	
"Never Gonna Give You Up"  4:12
"Can't We Fall in Love Again" - (Duet With Phyllis Hyman)  3:42
"Take Care"  6:34
"Make It Easy On Yourself"  3:51
"(We Are Here To) Geek You Up"  6:30
"In It For The Goodies"  3:33
"Come To Me"  3:36

Personnel
Michael Henderson - vocals, bass, background vocals
David Miles, Dennis Briggs, Mario Resto, Mitch Holder, Ralph Armstrong, Tim May - guitar
Nathan East - bass
Lester Williams, Louis Resto, Michael D. Caylor, Mike Lang, Ted Harris, John Barnes, Michael Boddicker - keyboards
Darryl Jennings, Leon "Ndugu" Chancler, Richard Allen - drums
Alan Estes, Carl "Butch" Small, Chuck Jackson, Tony Coleman - percussion
Dusty, Dwayne Harris, Venna Keith - background vocals
Carl Trudell and the Detroit Horns - horns
Carl Austin Strings - strings
David Van DePitte - horn and string arrangements

Charts

Singles

References

External links 
 Michael Henderson-Slingshot at Discogs

1981 albums
Michael Henderson albums
Buddah Records albums